Susŏng station is a railway station in Susŏng-dong, Sŏngp'yŏng-guyŏk, Ch'ŏngjin-si, North Hamgyŏng, North Korea, on the Hambuk Line of the Korean State Railway.

It was opened by the Chosen Government Railway on 5 November 1916 together with the rest of the Ch'ŏngjin–Ch'angp'yŏng section of the former Hamgyŏng Line.

References

Railway stations in North Korea
Railway stations opened in 1916